Gilbert Ker was a Scottish soldier in the Wars of the Three Kingdoms.

He was involved with the Western Association (Scotland). As a colonel, he led the Scottish army which was defeated at the Battle of Hieton in 1650, where he was wounded and captured.

References

Scottish soldiers
17th-century Scottish people